Killings and massacres during the 1948 Palestine war resulted in the deaths of hundreds of civilians and unarmed soldiers.

The historiography of the events has been revisited by the New Historians, starting in the 1980s as well as by Palestinian scholars.

Events

Background

After about 30 years of conflict in Mandatory Palestine between Palestinian Arabs, the British authorities and Palestinian Jews, the British decided in February 1947 to terminate the Mandate and, on 29 November 1947, the United Nations General Assembly adopted Resolution 181 (II) recommending the adoption and implementation of a plan of partition of Palestine.

The vote was rejected by the Arab parties, and was immediately followed by a civil war between Palestinian Arabs who were supported by the Arab Liberation Army against the Palestinian Jews, while the region was still fully under British rule.
The day after the vote, Arabs launched attacks against the Jews, killing 126 of them during the first two weeks and 75 were massacred in a refugee camp in Aden as a retaliation. In Jerusalem, attacks targeted Jewish businesses and residents of Jewish neighborhoods, some of whom were stabbed in the street or murdered on buses. Jews were also attacked in Arab neighborhoods. In the Kibbutz of Gvulot, six Jewish teenage girls were murdered. In major cities, snipers (including mercenaries) fired at Jewish pedestrians and traffic. The Carmel Market was also attacked and grenades were thrown in the Jewish quarters. Across the country, Jewish cars were the target of stone throwing, while the consulates of Poland and Sweden, which voted in favor of partition, were attacked. In December 1947, one of the striking images remains the attack on the new Mamilla Mall. Jewish civilians were killed in many localities.

On 15 May 1948, following the Israeli Declaration of Independence the previous day, the armies of a number of Arab countries invaded what had just ceased to be Mandatory Palestine, turning the conflict into the 1948 Arab–Israeli War. The yishuv ( now officially called Israel) suffered between 5,700 and 5,800 casualties. The death toll on the Arab side is unclear, but according to Benny Morris, it might have been slightly higher or much higher than the Jewish one. In his book, Morris mentions an estimate of 12,000 provided by Haj Amin al-Husseini in 1950. These numbers amount to around 1 percent of the population of each side.

Scale

Massacres
According to several historians, between 10 and 70 massacres occurred during the 1948 war. According to Benny Morris the Yishuv (or later Israeli) soldiers killed roughly 800 Arab civilians and prisoners of war in 24 massacres. Aryeh Yizthaki list 10 major massacres with more than 50 victims each. Palestinian researcher Salman Abu-Sitta lists 33 massacres, half of them occurring during the civil war period. Saleh Abdel Jawad lists 68 villages where acts of indiscriminate killing of prisoners, and civilians took place, where no threat was posed to Yishuv or Israeli soldiers.

The main massacres and attacks against Jewish civilians were the Haifa Oil Refinery massacre where 39 Jews were killed by Arab workers after Irgun members had thrown a bomb into the crowd and the Kfar Etzion massacre where around 120-150 residents and defenders were killed by Arab irregulars, according to some accounts with the participation of Arab Legion soldiers. The Hadassah medical convoy massacre, with 80 deaths,  included the mass killing of medical personnel by Arabs.

According to Rosemarie Esber, both Israeli archives and Palestinian testimonies confirm killings occurred in numerous Arab villages. Most of these killings occurred as villages were overrun and captured during the Second phase of the Civil War, Operation Dani, Operation Hiram and Operation Yoav. Morris said that the "worst cases" were the Saliha massacre with 60 to 70 killed, the Deir Yassin massacre with around 112, the Lydda massacre with around 250, and the Abu Shusha massacre with 60–70. In Al-Dawayima, accounts of the death toll vary. Saleh Abd al-Jawad reports 100-200 casualties, Morris has estimated "hundreds" and also reports the IDF investigation which concluded 100 villagers had been killed. David Ben-Gurion gave the figure of 70–80. Saleh Abd al-Jawad reports on the village's mukhtar account that 455 people were missing following the al-Dawayima massacre, including 170 women and children.

Controversy surrounds the assertion that a massacre by Israelis took place at Tantura.

Bombing attacks
At the beginning of the Civil War, Jewish militias organized several bombing attacks against civilians and military Arab targets. On 12 December 1947, the Irgun placed a car bomb opposite the Damascus Gate, the main entrance to the Old City of Jerusalem, killing 20 people. On 4 January 1948, the Lehi detonated a lorry bomb against the headquarters of the paramilitary al-Najjada located in Jaffa's Town Hall, killing 15 Arabs and injuring 80.

During the night between 5 and 6 January, in Jerusalem, the Haganah bombed the Semiramis Hotel that had been reported to hide Arab militiamen, killing 24 people. The next day, Irgun members in a stolen police van rolled a barrel bomb into a large group of civilians who were waiting for a bus by the Jaffa Gate, killing 20. Another Irgun bomb went off in the Ramla market on 18 February, killing 7 residents and injuring 45. On 28 February, the Palmach organised a bombing attack against a garage in Haifa, killing 30 people.

From 1 February 1948, supporters of Amin al-Husseini organised, with the help of British deserters, three attacks against the Jewish community in Jerusalem. Using car bombs aimed at the headquarters of the Palestine Post, the Ben Yehuda Street market and the backyard of the Jewish Agency's offices, killing 22, 53 and 13 Jewish people respectively.

During the first months of 1948, the railway between Cairo and Haifa was often targeted. On 31 March, it was mined near Binyamina, a Jewish settlement in the neighborhood of Caesarea, killing 40 persons and wounding 60. The casualties were all civilians, mostly Arabs. Although there were some soldiers on the train, none were injured. The Palestine Post and the New York Times attributed the attack to Lehi.

Consequences

According to historians, whether deliberate or otherwise, the massacres did have a strong impact on the exodus of the Palestinian Arab population. For example, the Deir Yassin massacre is considered to have generated more panic among the Arab population than all other previous operations together and to have caused a mass flight of Palestinians in numerous areas, partly because the actual events at Deir Yassin were greatly embellished by the media.

Additionally, the Deir Yassin massacre became a strong argument for the Arab states to intervene against Israel. Arab League chief Azzam Pasha stated that 'The massacre of Deir Yassin was to a great extent the cause of the wrath of the Arab nations and the most important factor for sending [in] the Arab armies'.

Historiography

New historian perspectives 
Starting in the 1980s a group of revisionist Israeli historians have challenged the Israeli historical narrative. Israeli New Historians have pointed at accounts of killings and massacres.

Arab warnings and threats of massacres against Jews of Palestine 
After the Partition vote, some Arab leaders threatened the Jewish population of Palestine. For example, they spoke of "driving the Jews into the sea" or ridding Palestine "of the Zionist Plague".

According to the Israeli traditional historiography, these statements reflected the Arab intentions. While Benny Morris considers the real picture of the Arab aims to be more complex, notably because they were well aware they could not defeat the Jews, he argues that the Yishuv was indeed threatened with extinction and feared what would happen if the Arabs won. Gelber, on the other hand, regards these public statements as 'meaningless' and judges that the 'actions [of their armies] imply that the aims of the Arab invasion were decidedly limited and focused mainly on saving Arab Palestine from total Jewish domination'.

"Purity of arms"

During the conflict between Arabs and Jews in Palestine before the war, the criterion of "purity of arms" was used to distinguish between the respective attitudes of the Irgun and Haganah towards Arabs, with the latter priding itself on its adherence to this principle. Generally speaking, this precept requires that "weapons remain pure [and that] they are employed only in self-defence and [never] against innocent civilians and defenceless people". But if it "remained a central value in education" it was "rather vague and intentionally blurred" at the practical level.

In 1946, at a meeting held between the heads of the Haganah, Ben-Gurion predicted a confrontation between the Arabs of Palestine and the Arab states. Concerning the "principle of purity of arms", he stressed that: "The end does not justify all means. Our war is based on moral grounds" and during the 1948 War, the Mapam, the political party affiliated to Palmach, asked for "a strict observance of the Jewish Purity of arms to secure the moral character of [the] war".

When he was criticized by Mapam members for his attitude concerning the Arab refugee problem, Ben-Gurion reminded them the events of Lydda and Ramla and the fact Palmach officers had been responsible for the "outrage that had encouraged the Arabs' flight made the party uncomfortable."

According to Avi Shlaim, "purity of arms" is one of the key features of 'the conventional Zionist account or old history' whose 'popular-heroic-moralistic version of the 1948 war' is 'taught in Israeli schools and used extensively in the quest for legitimacy abroad'. Morris adds that '[t]he Israelis' collective memory of fighters characterized by "purity of arms" is also undermined by the evidence of [the dozen case] of rapes committed in conquered towns and villages.' According to him, 'after the war, the Israelis tended to hail the "purity of arms" of its militiamen and soldiers to contrast this with Arab barbarism, which on occasion expressed itself in the mutilation of captured Jewish corpses.' According to him, 'this reinforced the Israelis' positive self-image and helped them "sell" the new state abroad and (...) demonized the enemy'.

Causes of massacres
The causes of the massacres are a matter of controversy among New Historians. Morris considers that the killings and massacres occurred "[l]ike [in] most wars involving built-up areas." According to Ilan Pappé, these took place in the context of an ethnic cleansing that "carr[ied] with it atrocious acts of mass killing and butchering of thousands of Palestinians were killed ruthlessly and savagely by Israeli troops of all backgrounds, ranks and ages."

During the Civil War, the Haganah operatives had been cautioned against harming women and children but the Irgun and Lehi were less observing this distinction, while "Palestinian Arab militias often deliberately targeted civilians." Due to the fact the British Mandate was not yet over, neither side could set up regular Prisoner of War camps and therefore take prisoners. During the Arab-Israeli War, the fighting armies were more or less disciplined and "the killings of civilians and prisoners of war almost stopped, except for the series of atrocities committed by the IDF forces".

Morris also said that despite their rhetoric, Arab armies committed few atrocities and no large-scale massacre of prisoners took place when circumstances might have allowed them to happen, as when they took the Old City of Jerusalem or the villages of Atarot, Neve Yaakov, Nitzanim, Gezer and Mishmar Hayarden. On 28 May, when the inhabitants and fighters of the Old City surrendered, in fear for their lives, the Transjordanian Arab Legion protected them from the mob and even wounded or shot dead other Arabs. In contrast to Morris, the Jewish inhabitants of the Old City were expelled and 600 of them were killed, while the Jewish villages were evacuated by the inhabitants before being destroyed. Atrocities committed by the Arab armies includes women being dismembered in Nitzanim in June 14 Jewish civilians killed while supplying an orphanage in Ben Shemen and Arab fighters parading with the heads of two Israeli soldiers impaled on stakes in Eilabun. Jewish combatants captured by Arab militias, were frequently tortured and mutilated in particularly violent ways. Pregnant women have also been found disembowelled.

With regard to massacres perpetrated by the IDF at the end of the war and particularly during Operation Hiram, Morris and Yoav Gelber consider that lack of discipline cannot explain the violence. Gelber points out the "hard feelings [of the soldiers] towards the Palestinians" and the fact that the Palestinians had not fled like in former operations. Benny Morris thinks that they were related to a "general vengefulness and a desire by local commanders to precipitate a civilian exodus".

To explain the difference in the number of killings and massacres, Morris speculates that "[t]his was probably due to the circumstance that the victorious Israelis captured some four hundred Arab villages and towns during April–November 1948, whereas the Palestinian Arabs and the Arab Liberation Army failed to take any settlements and the Arab armies that invaded in mid-May overran fewer than a dozen Jewish settlements". He considers too that belligerents behaved reasonably well and that the "1948 [war] is noteworthy for the relatively small number of civilian casualties both in the battles themselves and in the atrocities that accompanied them" in comparison, for example, "with the Yugoslav wars of the 1990s or the Sudanese civil wars of the past fifty years".

Events of Tantura

There was a controversy among historians concerning the events of Tantura. On the night between 22 and 23 May 1948, soldiers of the Alexandroni brigade attacked the village. The fighting caused the deaths of a few dozen Arabs and 14 Israeli soldiers.

According to the analysis of Gelber, based on a counting of the inhabitants, the refugees, the POW's and the deaths, there were no people missing and therefore no massacre could have occurred.

Morris's analysis concludes that the documentation and the interviews do not prove that a massacre occurred but that the hypothesis cannot be simply dismissed. Ilan Pappé considers that the testimonies of former Alexandroni soldiers and Palestinian refugees prove, on the contrary, that at least 200 unarmed Tantura villagers were killed, whether in revenge for the death of Israeli soldiers due to sniper shots or later when they were unjustifiably accused of hiding weapons.

Palestinian perspectives 
Nadine Picaudou, author of The Historiography of the 1948 Wars, studied the evolution of Palestinian historiography on the 1948 war. She argues that the Deir Yassin massacre long remained the only one discussed 'as if it sufficed to summarize the tragedy of Palestinian victims'. She thinks that during the period for which 'collective memory conflated with Palestinian nationalist mobilization, one exemplary event sufficed to express the tragedy'. Referring to the study performed in 2007 by Saleh Abd al-Jawad, Zionist Massacres: the Creation of the Palestinian Refugee Problem in the 1948 War, she writes that the massacres engaged Palestinian historians' concerns relatively late, but that when "Palestinians began to write their history, the issue of massacres inevitably became one of the relevant factors in accounting for the mass exodus."

Picaudou underlines that "Palestinian historiography has retained the nakba paradigm, which reduces the Palestinians to the status of passive victims of Israeli policies, as [illustrated by] the limited attention accorded by researchers to the 1947–48 battles (...)".

"Battles" or "massacres"
In the context of the 1948 war, several historians pointed out the nuance, sometimes polemically, that can exist between a "battle" and a "massacre".

Deir Yassin

The village of Deir Yassin was located west of Jerusalem, but its strategic importance was debatable and its inhabitants had not participated in the war until one week before the attack. On 9 April, around 120 men from the Irgun and the Lehi attacked the village in the context of the Operation Nachshon. The poorly armed inhabitants showed unexpected resistance to the attack by fighting back. The assailants suffered four dead. Jacques de Reynier, head of the International Red Cross delegation in Palestine, visited Deir Yassin on April 11, 1948, and observed "a total of more than 200 dead, men, women, and children." After the fighting, some villagers were executed after being exhibited in the streets of Jerusalem. A group of prisoners were executed in a nearby quarry and others at Sheikh Bader. Historians estimate today the total number of deaths at 100 to 120.

In 2007, Israeli military historian Uri Milstein published a controversial book, Blood Libel at Deir Yassin, in which he claims that the events of Deir Yassin were the result of a battle and not of a massacre. Moreover, he goes further and rejects the reality of the atrocities that followed the attack on the village. Nadine Picadou also nuances the events and considers that in the Palestinian historiography, "the massacre of Deir Yassin eclipsed the battle of Deir Yassin". Morris considers that the capture of the village, insignificant on the military point of view, can hardly be considered as a "battle".

Hadassah medical convoy

In 1948, Hadassah hospital was located in the enclave of the Mount Scopus, at Jerusalem from where it dominated several Arab quarters. On 14 April, a convoy carrying medical personnel, some injured fighters, munitions and some reinforcement troops, that was protected by Haganah soldiers and armoured cars, tried to reach the enclave. Arab fighters had been informed by an Australian officer that the convoy's mission was to use the enclave to attack Arab quarters and cut off the road to Ramallah. A large Arab force then ambushed the convoy, and, in the fight, several vehicles were shot up, and couldn't withdraw. The battle raged for seven hours and British intervention was late in coming. 79 people from the convoy were killed, mainly civilians. Following the incident, Jacques de Reynier urged that in future all convoys be relieved of military escorts and placed under Red Cross protection. This was quickly agreed to. He also asked that the enclave be demilitarised under similar conditions, but this was refused by the Zionist authorities.

While the whole event is usually seen as a massacre, Morris considers it to have been, rather, a battle, given that there was shooting between Arab and Haganah militia and targeted a supply convoy headed for Mount Scopus. He points out however that the death toll incurred by medical personal, who were unarmed, was massive and that seventy-eight people were "slaughtered".

Lydda

In July 1948, the Israelis launched the Operation Danny to conquer the cities of Lydda and Ramle. The first attack on Lydda occurred on the afternoon of 11 July when the 89th battalion mounted on armoured cars and jeeps raided the city "spraying machine-gun fire at anything that moved". "Dozens of Arabs (perhaps as many as 200)" were killed. According to Morris, the description of this raid written by one of the soldiers "combine[s] elements of a battle and a massacre".

Later, Israeli troops entered the city and took up position in the town center. The only resistance came from the police fort that was held by some Arab Legionnaires and irregulars. Detention compounds were arranged in the mosques and the churches for adult males and 300–400 Israeli soldiers garrisoned the town. In the morning of 12 July, the situation was calm but around 11:30 an incident occurred; two or three armored cars entered the town and a firefight erupted. The skirmish made Lydda's townspeople believe that the Arab Legion was counter-attacking and probably a few dozen snipers fired against the occupying troops. Israeli soldiers felt threatened, vulnerable because they were isolated among thousands of hostile townspeople and 'angry [because] they had understood that the town had surrendered'. '[They] were told to shoot 'at any clear target' or, alternatively, at anyone 'seen on the streets'. The Arab inhabitants panicked. Many rushed in the streets and were killed.

There is controversy among historians about the events that followed. According to Morris, at the Dahmash mosque some prisoners tried to break out and escape, probably fearing to be massacred. IDF threw grenades and fired rockets at the compound and several dozens Arabs were shot and killed. The Palestinian historiography describes the events differently. According to it, it was civilians that had taken refuge in the mosque, thinking that the Israelis would not dare to profane the sanctuary. The Israelis killed all the people there making 93 to 176 dead. Alon Kadish and Avraham Sela write that there is a confusion between two mosques. According to them, detainees were only gathered around the Great Mosque, where no incident occurred and it is a group of 50-60 armed Arabs who barricaded in the Dahmash mosque. Its storming resulted in the death of 30 Arab militiamen and civilians, including elderly, women and children.

The deaths of July 12 are regarded in the Arab world and by several historians as a massacre. Walid Khalidi calls it "an orgy of indiscriminate killing." Morris writes that the "jittery Palmahniks massacr[ed] detainees in a mosque compound." According to Gelber, it was a "bloodier massacre" than at Deir Yassin. Alon Kadish and Avraham Sela write that it was "an intense battle where the demarcation between civilians, irregular combatants and regular army units hardly existed."

List

Here is a non-exhaustive list of killings and massacres that took place during the war:

See also
 Depopulated Palestinian locations in Israel
 List of killings and massacres in Mandatory Palestine
 List of massacres in Israel

Notes

References
 Joel Beinin, The Dispersion of Egyptian Jewry, University of California Press, 1998.
 Rosemarie Esber, Under the Cover of War. The Zionist Expulsion of the Palestinians, Arabicus Books and Media, 2009.
 Yoav Gelber, Palestine 1948, Sussex Academic Press, 2006.
 Saleh Abdel Jawad, Zionist Massacres: the Creation of the Palestinian Refugee Problem in the 1948 War, in E. Benvenisti & al, Israel and the Palestinian Refugees, Springer, 2007.
 Efraim Karsh, The Palestine War 1948, Osprey Publishing, 2002.
 Benny Morris, The Birth of the Palestinian Refugee Problem Revisited, Cambridge University Press, 2004.
 Benny Morris, 1948: A History of the First Arab-Israeli War, Yale University Press, 2008.
 Nur Masalha, Expulsion of the Palestinians, Institute for Palestine Studies, 1992.
 Ilan Pappé, The Ethnic Cleansing of Palestine, OneWorld Publishing, * Benny Morris, The Birth of the Palestinian Refugee Problem Revisited, Cambridge University Press, 2004.
 Howard Sachar, A History of Israel - From the Rise of Zionism to our Time, Knopf, 2007.
 Anita Shapira, Land and power, Stanford University Press, 1992.
 Malka Hillel Shulewitz, The forgotten millions, Continuum Int'l Publishing Group, 2000.

External links
 Benny Morris, Arab-Israeli War, in Roy Gutman (Editor), Crimes of War: What the Public Should Know, W. W. Norton & Company, 1999.
 Film about the massacre in Eilabun

1948 Arab–Israeli War
Massacres in Mandatory Palestine
Massacres in Israel during the Israeli–Palestinian conflict
1948 massacres of Palestinians